Network medicine is the application of network science towards identifying, preventing, and treating diseases. This field focuses on using network topology and network dynamics towards identifying diseases and developing medical drugs. Biological networks, such as protein-protein interactions and metabolic pathways, are utilized by network medicine. Disease networks, which map relationships between diseases and biological factors, also play an important role in the field. Epidemiology is extensively studied using network science as well; social networks and transportation networks are used to model the spreading of disease across populations. Network medicine is a medically focused area of systems biology.

Background 

The term "network medicine" was coined and popularized in a scientific article by Albert-László Barabási called "Network Medicine – From Obesity to the "Diseasome", published in The New England Journal of Medicine, in 2007. Barabási states that biological systems, similarly to social and technological systems, contain many components that are connected in complicated relationships but are organized by simple principles. Using the recent development of network theory, the organizing principles can be comprehensively analyzed by representing systems as complex networks, which are collections of nodes linked together by a particular relationship. For networks pertaining to medicine, nodes represent biological factors (biomolecules, diseases, phenotypes, etc.) and links (edges) represent their relationships (physical interactions, shared metabolic pathway, shared gene, shared trait, etc.).

Three key networks for understanding human disease are the metabolic network, the disease network, and the social network. The network medicine is based on the idea that understanding complexity of gene regulation, metabolic reactions, and protein-protein interactions and that representing these as complex networks will shed light on the causes and mechanisms of diseases. It is possible, for example, to infer a bipartite graph representing the connections of diseases to their associated genes using the OMIM database. The projection of the diseases, called the human disease network (HDN), is a network of diseases connected to each other if they share a common gene. Using the HDN, diseases can be classified and analyzed through the genetic relationships between them. Network medicine has proven to be a valuable tool in analyzing big biomedical data.

Research areas

Interactome 

The whole set of molecular interactions in the human cell, also known as the interactome, can be used for disease identification and prevention. These networks have been technically classified as scale-free, disassortative, small-world networks, having a high betweenness centrality.

Protein-protein interactions have been mapped, using proteins as nodes and their interactions between each other as links. These maps utilize databases such as BioGRID and the Human Protein Reference Database. The metabolic network encompasses the biochemical reactions in metabolic pathways, connecting two metabolites if they are in the same pathway. Researchers have used databases such as KEGG to map these networks. Others networks include cell signaling networks, gene regulatory networks, and RNA networks.

Using interactome networks, one can discover and classify diseases, as well as develop treatments through knowledge of its associations and their role in the networks. One observation is that diseases can be classified not by their principle phenotypes (pathophenotype) but by their disease module, which is a neighborhood or group of components in the interactome that, if disrupted, results in a specific pathophenotype. Disease modules can be used in a variety of ways, such as predicting disease genes that have not been discovered yet. Therefore, network medicine looks to identify the disease module for a specific pathophenotype using clustering algorithms.

Diseasome 

Human disease networks, also called the diseasome, are networks in which the nodes are diseases and the links, the strength of correlation between them. This correlation is commonly quantified based on associated cellular components that two diseases share. The first-published human disease network (HDN) looked at genes, finding that many of the disease associated genes are non-essential genes, as these are the genes that do not completely disrupt the network and are able to be passed down generations. Metabolic disease networks (MDN), in which two diseases are connected by a shared metabolite or metabolic pathway, have also been extensively studied and is especially relevant in the case of metabolic disorders.

Three representations of the diseasome are:
 Shared gene formalism states that if a gene is linked to two different disease phenotypes, then the two diseases likely have a common genetic origin (genetic disorders). 
 Shared metabolic pathway formalism states that if a metabolic pathway is linked to two different diseases, then the two diseases likely have a shared metabolic origin (metabolic disorders). 
 Disease comorbidity formalism uses phenotypic disease networks (PDN), where two diseases are linked if the observed comorbidity between their phenotypes exceeds a predefined threshold. This does not look at the mechanism of action of diseases, but captures disease progression and how highly connected diseases correlate to higher mortality rates.

Some disease networks connect diseases to associated factors outside the human cell. Networks of environmental and genetic etiological factors linked with shared diseases, called the "etiome", can be also used to assess the clustering of environmental factors in these networks and understand the role of the environment on the interactome. The human symptom-disease network (HSDN), published in June 2014, showed that the symptoms of disease and disease associated cellular components were strongly correlated and that diseases of the same categories tend to form highly connected communities, with respect to their symptoms.

Pharmacology 

Network pharmacology is a developing field based in systems pharmacology that looks at the effect of drugs on both the interactome and the diseasome. The drug-target network (DTN) can play an important role in understanding the mechanisms of action of approved and experimental drugs. The network theory view of pharmaceuticals is based on the effect of the drug in the interactome, especially the region that the drug target occupies. Combination therapy for a complex disease (polypharmacology) is suggested in this field since one active pharmaceutical ingredient (API) aimed at one target may not effect the entire disease module. The concept of disease modules can be used to aid in drug discovery, drug design, and the development of biomarkers for disease detection. There can be a variety of ways to identifying drugs using network pharmacology; a simple example of this is the "guilt by association" method. This states if two diseases are treated by the same drug, a drug that treats one disease may treat the other. Drug repurposing, drug-drug interactions and drug side-effects have also been studied in this field.

Network epidemics 
Network epidemics has been built by applying network science to existing epidemic models, as many transportation networks and social networks play a role in the spread of disease. Social networks have been used to assess the role of social ties in the spread of obesity in populations. Epidemic models and concepts, such as spreading and contact tracing, have been adapted to be used in network analysis. These models can be used in public health policies, in order to implement strategies such as targeted immunization and has been recently used to model the spread of the Ebola virus epidemic in West Africa across countries and continents.

Drug Prescription Networks (DPNs)
Recently, some researchers tended to represent medication use in form of networks. The nodes in these networks represent medications and the edges represent some sort of relationship between these medications. Cavallo et al. (2013)  described the topology of a co-prescription network to demonstrate which drug classes are most co-prescribed. Bazzoni et al. (2015)  concluded that the DPNs of co-prescribed medications are dense, highly clustered, modular and assortative. Askar et al. (2021)  created a network of the severe drug-drug interactions (DDIs) showing that it consisted of many clusters.

Other Networks 
The development of organs  and other biological systems can be modelled as network structures where the clinical (e.g., radiographic, functional) characteristics can be represented as nodes and the relationships between these characteristics are represented as the links
among such nodes. Therefore, it is possible to use networks to model how organ systems dynamically interact.

Educational and Clinical Implementation 

The Channing Division of Network Medicine at Brigham and Women's Hospital was created in 2012 to study, reclassify, and develop treatments for complex diseases using network science and systems biology. It focuses on three areas: 
 Chronic Disease Epidemiology uses genomics and metabolomics in large, long-term epidemiology studies, such as the Nurses' Health Study. 
 Systems Genetics & Genomics focuses on complex respiratory diseases, specifically COPD and asthma, in smaller population studies. 
 Systems Pathology uses multidisciplinary approaches, including as control theory, dynamical systems, and combinatorial optimization, to understand complex diseases and guide biomarker design.

Massachusetts Institute of Technology offers an undergraduate course called "Network Medicine: Using Systems Biology and Signaling Networks to Create Novel Cancer Therapeutics". Also, Harvard Catalyst (The Harvard Clinical and Translational Science Center) offers a three-day course entitled "Introduction to Network Medicine", open to clinical and science professionals with doctorate degrees.

See also 

 Biological network
 Biological network inference
 Bioinformatics
 Complex network
 Glossary of graph theory
 Graph theory
 Graphical models
 Human disease network
 Interactome
 Metabolic network
 Network dynamics
 Network Science
 Network theory
 Network topology
 Pharmacology
 Systems biology
 Systems pharmacology
 Targeted immunization strategies

References 

Network theory